The 1976 Australasian Individual Speedway Championship was the inaugural Australasian Final, introduced for Motorcycle speedway riders from Australia and New Zealand as part of the qualification for the 1976 Speedway World Championship.

South Australian Champion John Boulger took out the Final from fellow Australians Billy Sanders and Phil Crump. The then four time World Champion Ivan Mauger finished fourth to grab the final spot in the 1976 Intercontinental Final at London's famous Wembley Stadium.

Mitch Shirra, who before the end of the 1970s would be riding for his native New Zealand (he was born in Auckland), actually rode as an Australian in this meeting complete with the Australian flag on his breast plate. Sixteen-year-old Shirra (who in late 1973 began riding at the age of 14 after lying about his age) was living in Sydney and considered the Liverpool International Speedway to be his home track.

Australasian Final
 21 February
  Auckland, New Zealand - Western Springs Stadium
 Referee: 
 Qualification: First 4 to the Intercontinental Final in London, England

References

See also
 Sport in New Zealand
 Motorcycle Speedway

Speedway competitions in New Zealand
1976 in speedway
Individual Speedway Championship
1976 in New Zealand motorsport